Er Wang (Two Wangs or Two Kings) may refer to:

 Wang Xizhi and Wang Xianzhi (calligrapher), Jin dynasty father-and-son calligraphers
 Wang Zongfang and Wang Zongwei, Chinese serial killers
 Erwang Temple, in Dujiangyan City, Sichuan, China

See also
 Erlang (disambiguation)

Nicknames